List of models and variants of the T-80 main battle tank.

Command tanks with additional radio equipment have K added to their designation for komandirskiy ("command"), for example, T-80BK is the command version of the T-80B. Versions with reactive armour have V added, for vzryvnoy ("explosive"), for example T-80BV. Less-expensive versions without missile capability have a figure 1 added, as T-80B1.

List of models

Ob'yekt 219 SP1 
The prototype designed by Nikolay Popov was constructed in 1969 by Leningrad Kirov Plant (LKZ) and designated Object 219 SP1. It was essentially the T-64T powered by a GTD-1000T multi-fuel gas turbine engine producing up to 1,000 hp (746 kW). During the trials it became clear that the increased weight and dynamic characteristics required a complete redesign of the vehicle's suspension.

Ob'yekt 219 SP2 
The second prototype, designated Object 219 SP2, received bigger drive sprockets and return rollers. The number of road wheels was increased from five to six. The construction of the turret was altered to use the same compartment, 125 mm 2A46 tank gun, autoloader and placement of ammunition as the T-64A. Some additional equipment was borrowed from the T-64A. The LKZ plant built a series of prototypes based on Object 219 SP2. In 1976 it became the T-80.

T-80 (Ob'yekt 219) (1976) 
First production model. The T-80 has some features of both the T-64 and T-72, and other features unique to itself. In general, the offensive capabilities of the T-80 are similar to the T-64A, but it is faster thanks to the GTD-1000T 1,000 hp (746 kW) multi-fuel gas turbine engine. Visual keys are large, die-cast, irregularly spaced, ribbed, rubber-tired road wheels with three support rollers, a self-entrenching blade on the lower glacis, a Luna searchlight in the same position as the T-64. Significant differences are a coincidence rangefinder, and probable enhanced armor on the glacis (an upper glacis of steel layers enclosing fiberglass layers and a cast steel turret enclosing nonmetallic materials). Unlike the later models, the early T-80 had V-shaped splash plate on glacis plate. Due to its armour being obsolete, only a few hundred were built between 1976 and 1978 before the production switched to the T-80B. Some T-80s were later upgraded to B level.

 T-80M-1 – T-80 with an Arena countermeasures array fitted to rear of the turret's roof. It also has an armour belt around turret.

T-80B (Ob'yekt 219R) (1978) 
This first major redesign features a modified turret with new composite K ceramic armor providing better protection against APFSDS kinetic energy penetrators at the front of the hull and turret. The protection level of the turret increased from 410 mm of steel to 500 mm of steel. It also includes 1A33 fire control system, 9K112-2 system which allows firing 9M112 "Kobra" (NATO code: AT-8 Songster) ATGM using the tank's barrel. The missile control box is mounted in front of the cupola and has angled support. The ATGM may be launched while moving slowly and can be auto-loaded with the two-halves mated during ramming but the stub charge is manually loaded. Unlike T-80, T-80B does not have a splash plate on glacis plate. Retained gun 2A46-2 from basic T-80.

 T-80B obr.1980g. – T-80B with a new 1,100 hp (820 kW) GTD-1000TF gas turbine engine.
 T-80BK (Ob'yekt 660) – T-80B command tank equipped with additional R-130 radio, TNA navigation set, a 2nd whip antenna and a telescopic mast. It does not have the 9K112-2 system.

T-80A (Ob'yekt 219A) (1982) 
A further development of T-80B. It was developed in late 1970s and first model was produced in 1982. It was an attempt to provide the T-80B tank with an improved armour and firepower. It uses 1,200 hp (895 kW) GTD-1000M gas turbine engine. It has the 9K119 system which allows it to fire 9M119M Invar (AT-11B Sniper) ATGM using the tank's barrel. It also had several pintle mounts for the NSVT heavy machine gun and other improvements. The ammo load for 125 mm smoothbore tank gun was increased considerably when comparing it to the one of T-80B (T-80B – 38 rounds, T-80A – 45 rounds). It has some features of the future T-80U including the new turret with stronger armour and equipped with a new fire control system with the 1G46 gunner's sight. However, because of all those improvements T-80A is 2.8 tonnes heavier than the T-80B. It never left the prototype stage and was further developed as T-80U.

 T-80A obr.1984 – T-80A with Kontakt-1 explosive reactive armour. The model with Kontakt-1 is sometimes called T-80AV. The main external difference from the T-80BV is the lack of Kobra missile guidance box in front of the commanders cupola.
 T-80AK – Command variant of T-80A.
 T-80AK obr.1984 – T-80A with Kontakt-1 explosive reactive armour. The model with Kontakt-1 is sometimes called T-80AKV.

T-80BV (Ob'yekt 219RV) (1985) 
T-80B with Kontakt-1 explosive reactive armour. The smoke grenade launchers were moved from either side of the main armament back to the either side of the turret and positioned between the turret side and the ERA panels. On the turret of the T-80BV, the panels are joined to form a shallow chevron shape. ERA is also fitted to the forward part of the turret roof to provide protection against attacks from above. While the ERA provides a high degree of protection against ATGM of its time which relied on a HEAT warhead to penetrate armor over the frontal arc, it does not provide any added protection against APDS or APFSDS. Vehicles which were built first for sometime lacked the ERA because of supply problems. Some T-80BV tanks have been equipped with dust flap under glacis plate and some of them were equipped with single line of ERA along top of hull side. A late production version had a new turret similar to the T-80U but with Kontakt-1 ERA. There is a new gun 2A46M-1 with 9K112 Kobra system capable of firing improved 9M112M Kobra ATGM through gun barrel.

 T-80BVK – as per T-80BK but with ERA. First models were just T-80BK tanks with ERA. Later models were T-80BV tanks with additional communications equipment and an antenna.

T-80U (Ob'yekt 219AS) (1986) 
( "U" for uluchsheniye, meaning "improvement") A further development of T-80A. It was produced as a new vehicle, nothing to do with old tanks from storage. This version has a new 1,100 hp (820 kW) GTD-1000F multi-fuel gas turbine engine and new turret with improved composite armor. T-80U also received a different engine decking. Additional protection is provided by Kontakt-5 explosive reactive armour and Shtora-1 APS. There is the same gun 2A46M-1 as on T-80BV but with a new 9K120 Svir system which allows firing 9M119 Svir (AT-11 Sniper) and 9M119 Refleks (AT-11B Sniper) ATGMm through the gun barrel. Also the 12.7 mm NSVT heavy machine gun received the ability to be fired from within the turret with a use of a remote-control which work in a similar manner to the one in T-64. New fire control system 1A45 Irtysh with 1V528-1 Ballistic Computer. Buran-PA night sight for gunner. PNK-4S (Agat) day/night sight for commander. Infra-red searchlight "Luna" mounted on the commander's cupola. Like all of the previous T-80 models, the T-80U has full length rubber side skirts protecting the sides but those above the first three road wheels are armored and are provided with lifting handles. There are also rubber elements fitted beneath the front glacis which provide additional protection against mines with tilt-rod fuses and HEAT warheads. The forward skirt elements are armored and a radiation absorption liner coat is mounted on the inside and on the outside of armour. The turret roof between the commander's and gunner's hatches has been provided with additional protection against attack from above. Driver's protection, particularly against mine explosions, is enhanced by suspending the driver's seat from the hull roof. Two clusters of four 81 mm 902B Tucha electrically operated smoke dischargers are mounted on either side of the turret.  Early production version of T-80U still used Kontakt-1 ERA. A special camouflage paint distorts the tank's appearance in the visible and IR wavebands. GTA-18A Auxiliary Power Unit is used when the engine is off. Late production version had a more powerful GTD-1250D multi-fuel gas turbine engine and the "Brod-M" snorkel.

 T-80U obr. 1992 – T-80U with an improved 1,250 hp (930 kW) GTD-1250 multi-fuel gas turbine engine.
 T-80UK – Command version, equipped with additional R-163-50K and R-163-U radios, TNA-4 land navigation system, TShU-1-7 Shtora countermeasures system, electronic fuze-setting device that permits use of "Ainet" shrapnel round, a meteorological sensor, laser warning receivers, "Agava-2" thermal sight which provides a 2,600-meter night acquisition range, fire control and APU. Became the main Russian export tank in the 1990s. It can be easily recognized by EO boxes on the front of turret on either side of the main armament and multiple radio antennas.
 T-80UE (1999) – Export version of the T-80U with some of the equipment from the T-80UK (including the TShU-1-7 Shtora electro-optical countermeasures system). Unlike the T-80U it does not have the anti-aircraft heavy machine gun mounted on the commander's cupola, instead it has pintle mounts at the four corners of the turret allowing its position to be switched.
 T-80UM (Object 219AS-M)  – Modern version of T-80U. Modernization of 1995. Russian version with a new weapon system for the 9M119M Refleks (AT-11B Sniper) ATGM, new thermal imaging sight "Agava-M1" (optionally "Agava-2" or "Buran-R") because of which the L-4 "Luna" IR has been removed.
 T-80UM-1 "Bars" 'Snow Leopard' – Russian 1997 prototype with new Arena active protection system (Zaloga 2000:4).
 T-80UM-2 – Russian prototype with KAZT Drozd active protection system (Zaloga 2000:4).
 Chorny Oryol (Ob'yekt 640) (Black Eagle) – A series of Russian demonstration prototypes with new turret including separate crew and ammunition compartments, blow-out panels on the ammunition compartment, new autoloader, Kaktus ERA, new targeting systems, and other undisclosed improvements. Six and seven-axle versions have been demonstrated.
 T-80UM+ Obr. 2022 – produced in 103rd repair plant near Chita, after the complete suspension of production of T-90A. Old tanks from storage were used for this upgrade. New gas turbine engine, new universal tracks. Improved 1A45T "Irtysh" fire control system (from T-90A), new 1PN96MT-02 sight (slightly better than Agava-2 on T-80UM). Kontakt-5 ERA on hull and turret, additional anti-cumulative protection.

 T-80UD "Bereza" (Ob'yekt 478B) (NATO code: SMT M1989) (1985) – (Bereza – birch-tree) Ukrainian diesel-engined version of the T-80U, with 1,006 hp (750 kW) 6TD engine, and a new welded turret. Early production version used Kontakt-1 ERA which was later replaced with Kontakt-5 ERA.
 T-80UDK – T-80UD command tank. Prototype only.
 Ob'yekt 478BK – T-80UD with a welded turret.
 Ob'yekt 478BEh – T-80UD sold to Pakistan.
 Ob'yekt 478DU2 – Development of the T-80UD, that brought about a family of Ukrainian MBTs including T-84, T-84U, T-84 Oplot, and T-84 Yatagan models.

T-80BVM (2017) 
By the end of 2021 up to 300 units produced by overhauling and upgrading old T-80B tanks from storages. The idea was to make it compatible with T-90M tanks (same gun, ammunition, ATGM, ERA etc) cause of supply lines. New "Relikt" ERA on turret and hull (front and sides), increased protection against land mines. Older tracks were replaced with the new universal, twin-pin design. New 2A46M-5 125mm gun with new anti-tank ammunition Svinets-1 (tungsten) and Svinets-2 (depleted uranium). 9K119M Refleks-M system is used to launch 9M119M Invar (also called Refleks-M) ATGM through gun barrel. 1A45T improved "Irtysh" fire control system (from T-90A) with new Sosna-U gunner`s sight. New panoramic sight for the commander. New radio communication. Upgraded gas turbine engine. Retained old turret, manual transmission, no APS, no GLONASS navigation. Optional "hard kill" APS Arena-M. Currently being delivered.

Variants
  – Armoured recovery vehicle (ARV) based on the T-80U, with a large superstructure on the forward half of the chassis, a large square-section 18-tonne crane on the left side of hull and 35-tonne winch (in contrast to earlier Soviet ARVs which had light jib cranes).
 BTU-80 – Dozer vehicle based on T-80.
 MTU-80 – Bridge layer based on T-80 chassis.
 PTS-4 – Amphibious load carrier based on T-80.
  – Initially called Debut, this APC is designed for evacuation of Soviet government from Kremlin to airport under nuclear/chemical/biological attack. Ladoga uses tracks from the T-80U as well as suspension system and gas-turbine powerplant. The crew is 2 soldiers. It also has a four-seat cab equipped with a crew life-support facilities to protect the passengers against the radiological, chemical and bacteriological contamination of the environment.
 BREM-84 – Ukrainian ARV, based on the T-80UD but powered by the 6TD-2 engine of the T-84.
 2S19 "Msta-S" – Self-propelled 152 mm artillery gun based on T-80 running gear and the T-72's diesel engine.  There is also a NATO 155mm-barrelled version.

Table of specifications

References

Bibliography 

 
 
 
 
 
 
 
 

Main battle tanks of the Cold War
Cold War tanks of the Soviet Union
Post–Cold War main battle tanks
Main battle tanks of Russia
Main battle tanks of Ukraine